Jennifer X. Wen is professor of engineering at the University of Warwick, England, where she leads "Warwick FIRE", a "multidisciplinary research laboratory for both fundamental and applied research in fire, explosions and other safety related reactive and non-reactive flows". Wen is expected to join the University of Surrey's  School of Mechanical Engineering Sciences as Professor in Energy Resilience in January 2023.

She is vice-chair of the International Association for Fire Safety Science.

Education
Wen has a B.Eng. (1984) from Shanghai Jiao Tong University; a Ph.D. (1990) in heat transfer from Queen Mary and Westfield College, University of London; a Certificate in Management Studies (1993) from Oxford Brookes University; and a Postgraduate Certificate in Higher Education (1994) from London South Bank University.

References

Year of birth missing (living people)
Living people
Academics of the University of Warwick
Shanghai Jiao Tong University alumni
Alumni of Queen Mary University of London
Alumni of Oxford Brookes University
Alumni of London South Bank University
21st-century women engineers
Fire protection